Eduardo Conde  (April 9, 1948 – January 16, 2003) was a Brazilian singer and actor.

He portrayed Jesus Christ Superstar in Brazil in the 1970s, and a journalist in the movie The Emerald Forest in 1985. He was married to model and actress Betty Lago for many years.

References

1946 births
Brazilian male film actors
20th-century Brazilian male singers
20th-century Brazilian singers
Place of birth missing
Place of death missing
Brazilian male television actors
2003 deaths